Heath Mills (also Erfurt) is an unincorporated community located in the town of Sullivan, Jefferson County, Wisconsin, United States.

Notable people
Adolf Scheuber, Wisconsin State Assemblyman, merchant, and farmer, lived here.

Notes

Unincorporated communities in Jefferson County, Wisconsin
Unincorporated communities in Wisconsin